Banzet is a French surname. Notable people with the surname include:

 Janet Banzet (1934–1971), American actress
 Josette Banzet (1938–2020), French-born American-based actress 
 Sara Banzet (1745–1774), French educator and diarist

French-language surnames